Arthur Styles (born 3 September 1949), known as Archie Styles, is an English former professional footballer who played as a left back. He made more than 150 appearances in the Football League for several clubs.

Styles was born in Liverpool, and joined home-town club Everton on leaving school in 1965. He won representative honours for England at schoolboy and youth level. He was unable to make himself a regular part of Everton's first team, making only 23 league appearances in seven years at the club. In February 1974, together with Howard Kendall, he moved from Everton to Birmingham City in part-exchange for Bob Latchford, the whole deal valuing Latchford at £350,000 which was at the time a British transfer record. At Birmingham, facing competition from Garry Pendrey and others, he failed to establish himself as first choice at left back. In 1978, he moved to Peterborough United where he spent one season, followed by one season at Portsmouth, after which he joined the coaching staff at the club.

References
General
 
Specific

External links

Living people
1949 births
English footballers
Association football fullbacks
Everton F.C. players
Birmingham City F.C. players
Peterborough United F.C. players
Portsmouth F.C. players
English Football League players
Footballers from Liverpool